The 1987 Cincinnati Bengals season was the team's 18th in the National Football League (NFL). The team could not improve upon its 10–6 year of the previous campaign, as the team dipped to a record of 4–11 in a season shortened by one game due to another players' strike, in which replacement players were used for three games.

Offseason

NFL Draft

Personnel

Staff

Roster

NFL replacement players 
After the league decided to use replacement players during the NFLPA strike, the following team was assembled:

Regular season

Schedule

Standings

Team leaders

Passing

Rushing

Receiving

Defensive

Kicking and punting

Special teams

Awards and records 
 Anthony Muñoz, AFC Pro Bowl Selection
 Tim Krumrie, AFC Pro Bowl Selection

References

External links 
 1987 Cincinnati Bengals at Pro-Football-Reference.com

Cincinnati Bengals
Cincinnati Bengals seasons
Cinc